Feminist Economics is a peer-reviewed academic journal published by Routledge and the International Association for Feminist Economics (IAFFE) in the field of feminist economics.

According to the Journal Citation Reports, the journal has a 2015 impact factor of 1.154, ranking it 16th out of 40 journals in the category "Women's Studies".

History 
IAFFE established the journal in 1995, with Diana Strassmann as its founding editor. Feminist Economics was voted "Best New Journal" by the Council of Editors of Learned Journals in 1997.

See also 
 List of women's studies journals

References

External links 
 

Economics journals
English-language journals
Feminist economics
Feminist journals
Publications established in 1994
Quarterly journals
Taylor & Francis academic journals
Women's studies journals